Colonel Edward Keane (17852November 1866) was a British Army officer of the Napoleonic era who saw service during the Peninsular War and the Waterloo Campaign.

Life
He was the third son of Sir John Keane, 1st Baronet by Sarah, daughter of John Kelly and brother of John Keane, 1st Baron Keane.

Kene joined the British Army on the 1December 1803 and was promoted to lieutenant on 21November 1804. He served on the expedition to North Germany in 1805 and subsequently in the Peninsular War under Sir John Moore and from November 1813 under the Marquis of Wellington.

For his service during the Peninsular War he received the Silver Medal with clasps for Corruna, Nive, Orthes and Toulouse.

During the Waterloo Campaign he was aide-de-camp to Sir Hussey Vivian whose wife was a relative of Keane. At the Battle of Waterloo he was a captain in the 7th Hussars under Lord Uxbridge, being promoted to major after the battle.

He retired as a lieutenant-colonel on half-pay on 29March 1833.

Keane was subsequently reappointed to the Grenadier Guards and retired as a colonel in 1838.

He died aged 81 on 2November 1866 at Westerfield House, Worthing.

References

Bibliography

1785 births
1866 deaths
British Army personnel of the Napoleonic Wars
Younger sons of baronets